(also read as ) is the term for a being from Japanese folklore. The belief of shikigami originates from Onmyōdō. According to the tradition of Onmyōdō, shikigami is a symbol of onmyōjis power because onmyōji can freely use shikigami with magical powers. It has been associated with "curses" since the 1000s of the Heian period, and was often depicted as a bird or a child in Japanese literature and Emakimono.

Description
Shikigami are conjured beings, made alive through a complex conjuring ceremony. Their power is connected to the spiritual force of their master, where if the invoker is well introduced and has much experience, their shiki can possess animals and even people and manipulate them, but if the invoker is careless, their shikigami may get out of control in time, gaining its own will and consciousness and can even raid its own master and kill them in revenge. Usually shikigami are conjured to exercise risky orders for their masters, such as spying, stealing and enemy tracking. Shikigami are said to be invisible most of the time, but they can be made visible by binding them into small, folded and artfully cut paper manikins. There are also shikigami that can show themselves as animals.

In the Izanagi-ryū folk religion, the most elite onmyōji could also conjure an exceptionally powerful type of shikigami called a shikiōji to ward off disasters or demons that cause sickness. Regular mystics could not attempt to summon it without risking losing control of it due to its oni-like nature.

See also
 Dogū
 Familiar spirit
 Haniwa
 Hoko doll
 Kokeshi
 Pelesit
 Poppet
 Totem
 Ushabti
 Voodoo doll
 Zuijin

References

Japanese folklore
Japanese ghosts
Shinto kami
Onmyōdō